Paripueira is a municipality located in the Brazilian state of Alagoas. Its population is 13,332 (2020) and its area is 93 km².

A tourist community, in the Tupi language  “paripueira” means “calm waters”. Among the city's attractions are beautiful beaches with tide pools, such as the Praia de Sonho Verde (Green Dream Beach), which stands out for its beauty and for its infrastructure. In this ecological refuge can be found the Amazonian manatee, a threatened species unique to Latin America and protected here by the Municipal Marine Park for the Preservation of the Manatee.

History

Geography
Borders: Barra de Santo Antônio, Maceió, São Luiz do Quitunde and Atlantic Ocean. 5 meters above sea level.
Area: 94.1 km²
Climate: Subtropical, hot and humid. High of 36°C (97°F) and low of 23°C (73°F).
Population: 13,332 inhabitants.
Electorate: 7,309 voters.
Economy: Fishing, tourism, sugar cane.
Education: 2,030 seats (state and municipal systems).
Health: 2 clinics.
Access: AL-101 North.

Tourism
Paripueira is one of the longest beaches in Alagoas. At low tide it is possible to walk miles offshore in knee-deep water. The beach has summer homes, fishermen and 25 tide pools, the largest concentration of tide pools in the world. The coral formations in the region are considered the second largest barrier reef in the world.

References

Populated coastal places in Alagoas
Municipalities in Alagoas